The Joint statement on the occasion of the Joint Catholic-Lutheran Commemoration of the Reformation was signed by Pope Francis of the Catholic Church and Bishop Munib Younan, president of the Lutheran World Federation, on 31 October 2016 during a Reformation Day traditional service at the Lund Cathedral in Lund, Sweden.

This was the first time leaders of the Catholic Church had met representatives of the Lutheran World Federation as part of a commemoration of the Reformation Day. Pope Francis explicitly stated that it was not a "celebration" because of the schism that had resulted; rather, he termed it a "commemoration" in order to pursue a dialogue with the Lutheran Protestants. The traditional service heralded 12 months of events leading up to the 500th anniversary in 2017 of Martin Luther nailing his 95 theses to a church door in Wittenberg, Germany.

See also
 Catholic–Orthodox Joint Declaration of 1965

References

External links 
 Full text of the Joint Declaration of Pope Francis and Bishop Munib Younan
On the Vatican website (below the homily)

2016 in Christianity
2016 documents
Catholic–Protestant ecumenism
Documents of Pope Francis
21st-century Catholicism